Talangpelempang is a town in the Jambi Province of Sumatra, Indonesia.

Nearby towns and villages include Pinangtinggi (13.6 nm), Bejubang (11.0 nm), Tempino (2.0 nm), Paalmerah (14.2 nm), Talang Gudang (6.1 nm) and Muarabahar (14.4 nm).

References

External links
Satellite map at Maplandia.com

Populated places in Jambi